Cuphea oil is oil pressed from the seeds of several species of the genus Cuphea. Interest in cuphea oils is relatively recent, as a source of medium-chain triglycerides like those found in coconut oil and palm oil. Cuphea oil is of interest because it grows in climates where palms - the source of both of these oils - do not grow.

The fatty acid content of cuphea oils are as follows. The composition of coconut oil is included for comparison:

These oils are also valuable as sources of single fatty acids. C. painteri, for example, is rich in caprylic acid (73%), where C. carthagenensis oil consists of 81% lauric acid. C. koehneana oil may be the richest natural source of a single fatty acid, with 95% of its content consisting of capric acid.

References

Vegetable oils